Asante is an album by jazz pianist McCoy Tyner released on the Blue Note label. It was recorded in 1970 and features performances by Tyner with alto saxophonist  Andrew White, guitarist Ted Dunbar, bassist Buster Williams, drummer Billy Hart, percussionist Mtume and vocalist "Songai" Sandra Smith appearing on two tracks. 

The Allmusic review by Scott Yanow states: "Asante is a bit unusual for the emphasis is on group interplay rather than individual solos." The CD release adds three tracks that originally appeared on the album Cosmos (1976).

Track listing 
All compositions by McCoy Tyner
Original LP
1. "Malika" - 14:02
2. "Asante" - 6:12
3. "Goin' Home" - 7:39
4. "Fulfillment" - 14:00

<small>Bonus tracks on CD release from Cosmos, recorded on July 21, 1970''</small>

5. "Forbidden Land" - 13:46
6. "Asian Lullaby" - 8:30
7. "Hope" - 14:11

Personnel 
 McCoy Tyner - piano, wooden flute
 Andrew White - alto saxophone (tracks 1-4), oboe (tracks 5–7)
 Ted Dunbar - guitar (tracks 1–4)
 Buster Williams - bass (tracks 1–4)
 Billy Hart - drums, African percussion (tracks 1–4)
 Mtume - congas, percussion (tracks 1–4)
 "Songai" Sandra Smith - vocals (tracks 1–2)
 Herbie Lewis - bass (tracks 5–7)
 Freddie Waits - drums, timpani, chimes (tracks 5–7)
 Hubert Laws - flute, alto flute (tracks 5–7)
 Gary Bartz - alto sax, soprano sax (tracks 5–7)

References 

1974 albums
Blue Note Records albums
Post-bop albums
Albums produced by Duke Pearson
McCoy Tyner albums
Albums recorded at Van Gelder Studio